Among horse-drawn vehicles, a trolley was a goods vehicle with a platform body with four small wheels of equal size, mounted underneath it, the front two on a turntable undercarriage. The wheels were rather larger and the deck proportionately higher than those of a lorry. A large trolley is likely to have had a headboard with the driver's seat on it, as on a lorry but a smaller trolley may have had a box at the front of the deck or the driver seated on a corner of the deck and his feet on a shaft. With a very small trolley, the 'driver' may even have led the horse as a pedestrian. They were normally drawn by a single pony or horse but a large trolley would have a pair.

It was primarily an urban vehicle so that, on the paved roads, the small wheels were not a handicap. In any case, the axles would normally be sprung. It was typically used by market fruiterers and greengrocers but commonly also by coal merchants. These would have a headboard to stabilize the front row of sacks which then held up the next and so on. The deck was at a good height for taking the bags onto the coalman's back and there was no protruding rear wheel to obstruct his access to them.

Many ended up with rag and bone merchants who were likely to add side and tail boards to keep their purchases aboard.

The largest and sturdiest trolleys were those used with lift vans.

As in many fields, as time went by, people used the word without understanding its detailed meaning so that it became applied less precisely and other configurations were given the name and some trolleys were known by other names. For example, the electric milk float is more a trolley than a float, as is the brewer's 'dray' seen at horse shows.

See also
 Cart
 Horsecars
 Wagon

References
Ingram, A. Horse-Drawn Vehicles Since 1760 (1977) 
Oxford English Dictionary (1971 & 1987) 

Wagons